Mississippi Highway 450 (MS 450) is a highway in western Mississippi. Its western terminus is at MS 1 south of Benoit. The route travels east to its eastern terminus at U.S. Route 61 (US 61) and US 278. It was designated in 1956, starting at MS 1 south of Scott, and ending at Choctaw. Starting in 1962, the section near Stringtown was rerouted significantly. The last realignment was in 1974, where the section near Stringtown was straightened, and US 61 moved east of Choctaw.

Route description
MS 450 is located in southern Bolivar County, and is maintained by the Mississippi Department of Transportation (MDOT). In 2013, MDOT calculated as many as 720 vehicles traveling east of Love Johnson Road, and as few as 190 vehicles traveling east of Deer Creek Drive. MS 450 is legally defined in Mississippi Code § 65-3-3.

MS 450 starts at MS 1 south of Scott, and travels east through farmland. The route soon crosses the Great River Railroad and intersects First Street, a road that leads to Scott. West of Davenport Road, MS 450 begins to shift southward. The road soon meets Stringtown Road at a T-intersection. MS 450 becomes concurrent with the road and travels south. About  later, the route turns east, and Stringtown Road continues south. At Dixon Road, the road shifts northward. It travels eastward again at Richard Road, and crosses a small creek east of Dummy Line Road. A few miles later, MS 450 enters the unincorporated town of Choctaw, where it intersects the old routing of US 61. It soon crosses a railroad, and travels to its eastern terminus at US 61 and US 278. The road continues as Boyles Street.

History
MS 450 first appeared on the maps in 1956, as a gravel road connecting from MS 1 to US 61. During the years 1958–1960, the western half of the route was rerouted northward. Soon, MS 450 ran through Stringtown and ended at Scott by 1962. More than half of the road was paved by then. Two years later, the route was fully paved and rerouted back south of Scott, with a new spur route connecting to Stringtown. By 1967, MS 450 connected from Stringtown to south of Scott instead, with the spur route being removed. The path near Stringtown became straightened out by 1974, going in a north–south direction. Also in the same year, US 61 was rerouted east of Choctaw, causing MS 450 to be extended east of the town. By 1999, US 278 became concurrent with US 61 through MS 450's eastern terminus. MS 450 has not changed significantly since 1999.

Major intersections

References

450
450